Nicolae Țurcan (born 9 December 1989) is a Moldovan footballer who plays as a goalkeeper for FC Codru Lozova.

References

External links 

1989 births
Living people
Moldovan footballers
Association football goalkeepers
Moldovan Super Liga players
Speranța Nisporeni players
FC Sfîntul Gheorghe players
Moldovan expatriate footballers
Moldovan expatriate sportspeople in Russia
Expatriate footballers in Russia
FC MVD Rossii Moscow players